In July 917, Æthelflæd launched her first offensive foray and selected the fortress at Derby as her target. At that time the local ruler had probably joined with the armies from Northampton and Leicester in a number of raids to attack Mercia. Aethelfled took advantage of the weakened burh and successfully assaulted the town in July 917; the whole region subsequently being annexed into English Mercia.

The Anglo-Saxon Chronicle says that in 917 "Aethelflaed Lady of the Mercians, with God's help, before Lammas obtained the borough that is called Derby. With all that belonged to it. There were also killed four thegns who were dear to her inside the gates" 

The Danes may well have established their military headquarters on the former Roman fort of Derventio. This  rectangular fort would have given the burh the equivalent of c. 500 hides. The Vikings had camped at nearby Repton in 874, and had abandoned it a year later after suffering significantly from disease during their stay (leading to the discovery of a grave containing 245 bodies).

References

917
Battles involving the Vikings
10th century in England
910s conflicts